The British Forces Broadcasting Service (BFBS) provides radio and television programmes for His Majesty's Armed Forces, and their dependents worldwide. Editorial control is independent of the Ministry of Defence and the armed forces themselves.

It was established by the British War Office (now the Ministry of Defence) in 1943. In 1944, it was managed by Gale Pedrick.

History

Originally known as the Forces Broadcasting Service (FBS), it was initially under the control of the British Army Welfare Service, its first effort, the Middle East Broadcasting Unit, being headquartered in Cairo.

Before and after the end of the Second World War various radio stations were set up, some using the FBS name, others using the name British Forces Network (BFN), but by the early 1960s these had all adopted the BFBS name.

From 1982 until 2020, BFBS formed part of the Services Sound and Vision Corporation (SSVC), a registered charity which is also responsible for the British Defence Film Library, SSVC Cinemas (now BFBS Cinemas), and Combined Services Entertainment (CSE; now BFBS Live Events), providing entertainment for HM Forces around the world. In March 2020, most of the properties under the SSVC umbrella were rebranded under the new BFBS and Forces brandings. On 23 July 2020, SSVC was renamed BFBS. BFBS does not carry commercial advertising.

BFBS Radio 

BFBS Radio operates 22 radio stations, broadcast on a combination of local DAB, FM and AM frequencies, online and on digital television. BFBS Radio is a music, news, entertainment and community service providing bespoke content to the global Forces Community with a focus on Forces News and connecting the Forces communities around the world.

Broadcasting
BFBS broadcasts to service personnel and their families and friends worldwide with local radio studios in Belize, Brunei, Canada, Cyprus, Germany, Gibraltar, the Falkland Islands, Nepal and operational areas.

From 12 January 2008, BFBS began a trial period of broadcasting nationwide across the UK on DAB, which ran until 31 March 2008. Audience research carried out during the trial concluded that it was successful and broadcasts continued for eight years until 6 March 2017 when the service ceased due to the cost to the charity SSVC.

On 1 April 2013, BFBS began a new 10-year contract for to supply all forces broadcasting service to British troops around the world and expanded its service to UK army bases formerly served by Garrison Radio. BFBS UK base stations now serve local communities in Aldershot (DAB), Aldergrove (DAB), Blandford (DAB), Bovington (DAB), Brize Norton (DAB), Bulford (DAB), Catterick (DAB), Colchester (DAB), Edinburgh (DAB), Fort George (DAB), Holywood (DAB), Inverness (DAB), Lisburn (DAB), and Portsmouth (DAB).

Programming
Bespoke news bulletins are broadcast every hour, 24 hours a day, utilising content from BBC News, IRN and BFBS's own team of Forces News reporters. The standard bulletin is three minutes long, with extended ten-minute Newsplus programmes on weekdays at 0400, 0700, 1100, 1300 and 1700 UK time. Two-minute-long news and sport headlines are broadcast on the half-hour during breakfast programming. Bulletins are broadcast around the clock on BFBS the Forces Station and BFBS Gurkha Radio, and during BFBS Radio 2's music programming.

Many of the programmes on BFBS Radio 2 are sourced from BBC Radio 4 and BBC Radio 5 Live, including the soap opera The Archers, which was popular in Hong Kong until BFBS Radio ceased broadcasting on 30 June 1997 before the handover to China. BFBS UK is a contemporary hit 'pop' station. It is similar in style to BBC Radio 2, playing current music and chat, as well as regular news bulletins.

On 31 May 2010, BBC Radio 1 teamed up with BFBS to transmit the 10-hour takeover show from Camp Bastion with BFBS presenters and shout outs from the military community. It repeated the link-up in 2011.

In December 2011, the UK's Smooth Radio broadcast its national breakfast show, presented by Simon Bates, from the BFBS studios in Camp Bastion. On 8 April 2012, Easter Sunday, BFBS simulcast a two-hour show with Smooth, presented jointly by Bates and BFBS's Rachel Cochrane, allowing family and friends of serving troops to connect with their loved ones.

BFBS Radio stations
BFBS currently has three main stations: BFBS the Forces Station (each with regional content), BFBS Radio 2 and BFBS Radio Gurkha. In addition, there are themed online stations under the BFBS branding; they are BFBS Beats, BFBS Rewind, BFBS Best of British, BFBS Edge and Samishran.

BFBS Gurkha Radio broadcasts on AM and DAB in selected UK locations as well as on FM in the Falkland Islands, Afghanistan, Brunei, Nepal, Belize and on Ops. It provides programmes in Nepali, for the Gurkha units serving with the British Army.

BFBS broadcast in Malta until 25 March 1979, when British forces left the islands. It ceased broadcasts from Berlin on 15 July 1994, following the end of the Cold War, German reunification, and the withdrawal of British forces from the city, after 33 years. The BFBS Berlin frequency was given up on 12 December 1994. BFBS also broadcast on FM in Belize, from Airport Camp near Belize City. These broadcasts could also be received in eastern parts of Guatemala. It ceased broadcasting in Belize in August 2011. The station re-opened in 2016.

BFBS Television 
BFBS Television started in Celle, near Hanover in the then West Germany, on 18 September 1975 from Trenchard Barracks. This used taped broadcasts from the BBC and ITV, flown to Germany from London, which were then rebroadcast using low-power UHF transmitters. Live broadcasts of news and sport began in 1982, using a microwave link between the UK and West Germany, extending as far east as West Berlin.

The BFBS TV service used the 625-line PAL system, used in the UK as well as West Germany. By 1982, it was available at 50 sites throughout northern and central regions of West Germany.

It was known as SSVC Television (Services Sound and Vision Corporation) between 1985 and 1997, when it reverted to the BFBS name.
Today it now broadcasts live via satellite. DVDs are still sent to forces serving in more remote areas. There was also a service known as Navy TV, which broadcasts time-shifted versions of the channel to Royal Navy vessels around the world via military satellite.

Programmes
Most programmes came from the BBC, ITV, Channel 4, Channel 5 and Sky, including news from BBC News, Sky News, ITN, and sport from BBC Sport and Sky Sports. BFBS also has its own programmes, including the daily news bulletin programme British Forces News and the children's programme Room 785.

Availability
BFBS Television was broadcast in some areas as a terrestrial service in the clear using low power transmitters to minimise "overspill" to non-service audiences and protect copyright. The satellite feed was encrypted for copyright reasons, as it is intended solely for HM Forces and their families. 

Until 1997, it was also widely available in Cyprus, but its signal was encrypted or confined to the Sovereign Base Areas of Akrotiri and Dhekelia. Following complaints from local broadcasters like Lumiere TV, which had bought local rights to show English football and other programming, the decision was made to encrypt the signal, starting with Nicosia in April 1997 and ending with Larnaca and Limassol in May 1998. The decision was criticised by MPs in an Early Day Motion. BFBS later ended terrestrial transmissions of its TV channel in Cyprus in January 2009.

However, as a result of card sharing by services personnel, BFBS TV (later BFBS 1) was available to unentitled viewers on the island, along with other channels until 2011, when an illegal pay-TV service was closed down in a joint operation by the Cyprus Police and the Audiovisual Anti-Piracy Alliance.

By contrast, BFBS TV was watched by civilians in the Falkland Islands, where for many years, it was the only terrestrial TV service. Initially it consisted of prerecorded programmes brought over on cassette from the UK, meaning that they were shown two weeks after the UK, but was later shown on a timeshifted basis (which means that "live" events were shown between 3 and 5 hours after they had actually happened.) This expanded the civilian terrestrial TV service as part of a digital upgrade, which included BFBS 1 and BFBS 2. BFBS 1 and 2 also became available to civilian audiences in Tristan da Cunha.

British Forces and their families stationed at British Army Training Unit Suffield (BATUS), located at Canadian Forces Base Suffield in Canada, had access to BFBS 1, a limited amount of BFBS 2 and BFBS 3 and Sky News on a 7-hour timeshift from CET. During the day, the television channel that BFBS 2/3 broadcast on, played BFBS Radio 1.

Content and channels
Until 27 March 2013, there were five BFBS Television services:

BFBS 1 (launched in September 1975; formerly BFBS Television and SSVC Television) – General programming from chat shows to soap operas, dramas to news, documentaries to sport. Relayed the BBC News Channel overnight and was later replaced by BBC One
BFBS 2 (launched in 2001) – A six-hour block of general entertainment and sports programmes shown four times around the clock. Replaced by a variation of BBC Two and merged with BFBS 3 Kids
BFBS 3 Kids (launched in 2008) – Children's programming and factual entertainment.
BFBS 4 (launched in May 2008) – Movie channel with two films a day, each shown six times around the clock.
BFBS 1 Day Later (launched in 2008) – Time-shifted channel which aired programmes from the previous day later at peak time in Afghanistan.

A combined version of the four main channels, called BFBS Navy TV, was available on some naval vessels.

In 2005, BFBS also began distributing commercial networks Kiss TV (previously
Q), Sky News, Sky Sports 1 and Sky Sports 2 to certain areas. It also started a movie channel on 2 May 2008, using money that it saved following the Premier League's decision to waive the £250,000 rights fee.

In 2010, BFBS also added Nepali TV (a TV channel in Nepali language based in the UK) in its channel line up for the benefit of Gurkha soldiers. This was replaced by Nepal Television (the state TV broadcaster of Nepal) on 1 March 2016.

Service changes
SSVC was awarded a new ten-year contract by the Ministry of Defence commencing on 1 April 2013. Fewer overseas troop deployments and reduced budgets resulted in a change to the previous TV service.

Since 27 March 2013, BFBS TV has offered timeshifted versions of BBC One, BBC Two, ITV, as well as two channels of its own. BFBS Extra offers a variety of entertainment programming from W (formerly Watch), Dave, Sky One, National Geographic Channel, ITV2, 3 and 4, the History Channel, Sky Atlantic and previously Channel 4 and Channel 5. BFBS Sport carries sport from BT Sport (replacing ESPN), Sky Sports, and Eurosport.

BBC Two carries children's programming from CBBC, until the late afternoon or early evening, while BFBS Extra carries programming from CBeebies until the evening. Additionally, the BBC One and ITV feeds are timeshifted to hit peak time in local time zones. Channel 4 and Channel 5 later became available as separate channels in 2019.

Forces TV
On 10 June 2014, SSVC launched Forces TV, a new channel aimed at the British Armed Forces. It is available on BFBS, Sky channel 181 in the United Kingdom only, Virgin Media channel 274 in the United Kingdom, Freeview channel 96 and Freesat channel 165, and on satellite Eutelsat 10A (10°E) alongside BFBS the Forces Station and on Astra2 satellite 28°E free-to-air. Its content is a mixture of news reports, entertainment, documentaries and features produced by BFBS. It is independent from the Ministry of Defence and is funded through advertising and sponsorship. On 30 June 2022, Forces TV ceased operations for good, due to the loss of its Freeview capacity.

Literature 
 Alan Grace: This Is the British Forces Network. The Story of Forces Broadcasting in Germany. Stroud (1996) 
 Alan Grace: The Link With Home. 60 Years of Forces Radio. Chalfont (2003) 
 Doreen Taylor: A Microphone and a Frequency. Forty Years of Forces Broadcasting. London (1983)  and 
 Oliver Zöllner: BFBS: 'Freund in der Fremde'. British Forces Broadcasting Service (Germany) – der britische Militärrundfunk in Deutschland. Göttingen (1996) [in German] .
 Oliver Zöllner: Forces Broadcasting: A 'Friend' Abroad. In: Communications, Vol. 21 (1996), issue 4, pp. 447–466 ISSN 0341-2059.
 Peter McDonagh: Me and Thirteen Tanks: Tales of a Cold War Freelance Spy.  London (2014) .
 Ivor Wynne Jones: BFBS Cyprus: 1948–1998.  (1998) .

See also 
 American Forces Network
 Canadian Forces Radio and Television
 Radio forces françaises de Berlin
 BBC Allied Expeditionary Forces Programme
 BBC Forces Programme
 BBC General Forces Programme

References

External links 

 
 Forces Network
 BFBS Radio
 BFBS Extra & BFBS Sport Television
 This is BFBS Television – 1983
 HONG KONG: BRITISH FORCES RADIO BROADCASTS FINAL PROGRAMME

Radio stations in the United Kingdom
International broadcasters
Military of the United Kingdom
Direct broadcast satellite services
1943 establishments in the United Kingdom
Military broadcasting
Radio stations established in 1943
Television channels and stations established in 1975